Bogd (saint, holy) is a sum (district) of Bayankhongor Province in south-western Mongolia. In 2006, its population was 2,900.

References 

Populated places in Mongolia
Districts of Bayankhongor Province